Nguyen Quang Hai or Nguyễn Quang Hải may refer to:
 Nguyễn Quang Hải (footballer, born 1985)
 Nguyễn Quang Hải (footballer, born 1997)